Cypsela may refer to:

Places
Cypsela (Arcadia), a fortress of ancient Arcadia, Greece
Cypsela (Thrace), a fortress of ancient Thrace, now in Turkey
İpsala, the modern town on the site of Cypsela in Thrace
, an ancient, possibly mythical city named in Avienus' Ora Maritima which would have been located in the coast of modern Catalonia and is transcribed as Cypsela, Cípsela or Gypsela in Catalan

Other uses
Cypsela (botany)